Rapala manea, slate flash, is a butterfly of the family Lycaenidae. It is found in most of the Indomalayan realm (excluding Taiwan).

The wingspan is 24–26 mm. Adult males have dark brown wings with a hint of purple on the cell area of the wings. The underside is greyish brown with two irregular bands. Females are lighter and have androconial patches at the costal margin of the hindwing.

The larvae of subspecies R. m. schistacea feed on the flowers of Rosaceae, Euphorbiaceae, Combretaceae and Leguminosae species, including Quisqualis indica and Acacia caesia. They are attended by ants. The larvae are dull rose red. Pupation takes place in a pinkish pupa, mottled with black. It is attached to the stem or a leaf of the host plant.

Subspecies
Rapala manea manea (Sulawesi)
Rapala manea schistacea (Moore, 1879) (India to northern Thailand, Sri Lanka, southern Yunnan, possibly the Andamans)
Rapala manea chozeba (Hewitson, 1863) (southern Thailand to Singapore, Sumatra, possibly Borneo)
Rapala manea asikana Fruhstorfer, 1912 (Java, possibly Bali)
Rapala manea enganica Fruhstorfer, 1912 (Enggano)
Rapala manea lombokiana Fruhstorfer, 1912 (Lombok)
Rapala manea baweanica Fruhstorfer, 1912 (Bawean)
Rapala manea philippinensis Fruhstorfer, 1912 (Philippines:Luzon, Mindanao, Palawan)

References

Rapala (butterfly)
Butterflies of Singapore
Butterflies described in 1863